Donald George Ridler (c. 1907 – June 4, 1963) was an American football player.  He played college football for Michigan State College (later known as Michigan State University). He also played professional football in the National Football League for the Cleveland Indians during the 1931 season. He later became the football coach and athletic director at Lawrence Technological University. He remained the athletic director at Lawrence Tech for 25 years.  He also served as the school's basketball coach starting in the mid-1940s and led the team to the 1951 National Invitation Tournament. He also served as entertainment director for the Michigan State Fair from 1950 to 1962.  He died at his home in Novi, Michigan, in 1963 at age 54.

References

1963 deaths
Michigan State Spartans football players
Cleveland Indians (NFL 1931) players
College men's basketball head coaches in the United States
Lawrence Tech Blue Devils men's basketball coaches
Year of birth uncertain
1900s births